Patty Fendick and Jill Hetherington were the defending champions. However, they 

did not compete that year.

Elizabeth Smylie and Janine Tremelling won in the final 7–6, 6–1 against Tracey Morton and Heidi Sprung.

Seeds
Champion seeds are indicated in bold text while text in italics indicates the round in which those seeds were eliminated.

 Elizabeth Smylie /  Janine Tremelling (champions)
 Louise Field /  Michelle Jaggard (first round)
 Jo-Anne Faull /  Rachel McQuillan (semifinals)
 Simone Schilder /  Clare Wood (quarterfinals)

Draw

References
 1989 Fernleaf Classic Doubles Draw

Doubles
Doubles
Well